Han Kjøbenhavn, often styled HAN Kjøbenhavn, is a brand of men's wear based out of Copenhagen, Denmark. It was founded by Jannik Wikkelsø Davidsen in 2008.

Description
The brand launched as an eyewear line and then expanded into apparel.Han Kjøbenhavn's first flagship store is located on Pilestræde 30 in central Copenhagen.

Han Kjøbenhavn presents at Copenhagen Fashion Week, which is held every year in February and August. The company's AW12 fashion film received a bronze lion for their "AW Collection 2012" film at the Cannes Lions International Festival of Creativity. In 2013, Han Kjøbenhavn made a list of the 15 best Scandinavian menswear brands  in Complex. In 2014, GQ listed Han Kjøbenhavn as one of eight must-know Scandinavian menswear brands.

In 2022, the brand opened a flagship store at Beak Street in London.

References

External links
 Official website
 "AW Collection 2012" film

Clothing brands
Clothing brands of Denmark
Clothing companies of Denmark
Clothing retailers of Denmark
Eyewear brands of Denmark
Clothing companies based in Copenhagen
Danish companies established in 2008
Companies based in Copenhagen Municipality